BII, Bii, bii, may refer to:

Places
 Bikini Atoll Airport, Marshall Islands (IATA code: BII)
 U1 (Berlin U-Bahn), formerly BII

People
 Bii (singer) (born 1989), Taiwanese singer

Groups, organizations, companies
 Bank Internasional Indonesia, former name of Bank Maybank Indonesia
 Basel Institute for Immunology
 Birds International Incorporated
 British Institute of Innkeeping
 British International Investment, a development finance institution of the UK government (formerly CDC Group plc, Commonwealth Development Corporation, and Colonial Development Corporation)

Other uses
 Business interoperability interface, interface that enables business interoperability between organisational systems
 Bisu language (ISO 639: bii), Loloish language spoken in Thailand
 Biyelgee, also called bii, Mongolian dance

See also

 
 
 
 B2 (disambiguation), including a list of topics named B.II, etc.
 BLL (disambiguation)
 B11 (disambiguation)